The United States women's national soccer team (USWNT) represents the United States in international women's soccer. The team is fielded by the United States Soccer Federation (USSF), the governing body of soccer in the United States, and competes as a member of the Confederation of North, Central American and Caribbean Association Football (CONCACAF). The United States competed in their first international match on August 18, 1985, a 1–0 loss in the Mundialito against Italy. In total, 252 players have appeared for the national team since its inception.

The United States have competed in numerous friendly and competitive competitions, and all players who have played in a match, either as a member of the starting eleven or as a substitute, are listed below. Each player's details include her playing position while with the team, the number of caps earned and goals scored in all international matches, and details of the first and most recent matches played in. The players in the list are ordered alphabetically using their most common name. All statistics are correct up to and including the match played on July 18, 2022, against Canada.

Key

Players

See also
 USWNT All-Time Best XI
 List of United States men's international soccer players
 List of women's footballers with 100 or more international caps
 List of women's footballers with 100 or more international goals

Notes

References

External links
 Women's national team at USSoccer.com

 Players
United States
Association football player non-biographical articles